Ford Valencia Body & Assembly (VB&A) is a major car assembly plant located at Almussafes on the southern edge of the Valencia conurbation, Spain.   with a production capacity of 450,000 vehicles a year and 8,000 employees, it is Ford's largest manufacturing complex outside the United States.

Origins
In 1973 the Ford Motor Company headed by Henry Ford II purchased  of orchard  on the edge of Valencia.    Exactly 1,000 days later, on 18 October 1976, the first Ford Fiesta rolled off the production line.  Just a week after that, on 25 October 1976, the king formally inaugurated the plant.   Construction had cost 680 million dollars.

At the time when the plant was planned, the dictator Francisco Franco was still in charge of the Spanish government which pursued a fiercely mercantilist economic policy.   The relatively short period that elapsed between the submission by Ford, on 23 December 1972, of their plan to the government and the plant's inauguration was seen as evidence of the government's enthusiasm for the project.   The domestic auto-industry at this time was nevertheless strongly protected, comprising partnerships between foreign automakers and Madrid based interests.   There was a requirement that Spanish built cars should incorporate at least 95% "domestic content" with any imported components subject to a 30% tariff:  there was a further requirement that none of the foreign automakers could hold more than 49% of the capital of a Spanish-based car manufacturer.   Negotiations took place between Ford executive Dick Holmes and the Spanish government to secure a less restrictive framework for the Ford project in view of the size and potential benefit to Spain from the investment, but Ford were still required to commit to exporting two thirds of the plant's production outside Spain (which seems to have aligned with their existing objectives), and restricting their penetration of the Spanish domestic auto-market to less than 10%.   Political changes following Franco's death later culminated with Spain joining the European Economic Community in 1986 which rendered these restrictions redundant.

The plant was built and fitted out under the leadership of Hanns Brand, who had previously been responsible for building the recently opened Ford Saarlouis plant, which provided the blue-print for the Valencia project.   The plant began manufacturing engines (the Kent/Valencia unit) in April 1976, with the first Fiestas coming off the line in October of that year.

The Fiesta was seen as the right car for the times, and at the opening of the plant it was described as the model which might overtake the fifteen million sales of the Ford Model T.   The Spanish market waiting list for the car exceeded a year in April 1977.

Output
After the 1973 Oil Shock persuaded Ford to move ahead with the production of a Renault 5 competitor, the plant under construction in Valencia became the obvious location for the car's production. When it opened, the plant was the designated Fiesta production facility for Europe, though after Franco's death it also assembled Escort models. Ford-based Mazda vehicles have also been assembled at the Valencia plant.

Currently the Kuga, Transit Connect, Tourneo Connect and S-Max models are produced.

The plant has produced over 9 million cars and was recently producing at the rate of 2,000 units per day.

In June 2022, Ford announced it will produce its future electric models at Ford Valencia Plant, leaving the future of the Saarlouis Body & Assembly plant past 2025 uncertain.

Employment
In 1977 the plant employed 7,500 workers, and there was talk of this increasing to 10,000 as full capacity was reached.

More recently, in 2006, with auto-production processes increasingly automated and Ford Europe suffering from serious over-capacity, the plant still had approximately 7,000 employees, and was estimated to account for 21,000 jobs when ancillary suppliers were included in the calculation.    The plant is reckoned to account for 8.2% of the economic output of Valencia.

Products

Past
 Ford Fiesta (1976–2012) 
 Ford Escort (1981–1998)
 Ford Orion (1983–1993)
 Ford Ka (1996–2008)
 Ford Focus (1998–2011)
 Mazda2 (2002–2007)
 Ford C-Max (2010–2015)
 Ford Galaxy (2015–2023)
 Ford Mondeo (2014–2022)
 Ford Transit Connect (2013–2022)
 Ford S-Max (2015–2023)

Current

 Ford Kuga (2013–present)

See also
 List of Ford factories

References

Valencia
Motor vehicle assembly plants in Spain
Buildings and structures in Valencia